Christy, Choices of the Heart is a 2001 American two-part television miniseries starring Lauren Lee Smith, Stewart Finlay-McLennan, James Waterston, Diane Ladd, Dale Dickey, Andy Stahl, and Bruce McKinnon. Individually, the first part is known as Christy: A Change of Seasons and the second part is known as Christy: A New Beginning. The miniseries was developed for television by executive producer Tom Blomquist, and aired on the Pax TV on May 13–14, 2001.

The storyline was an adaptation of a section of the Christy novel that was not presented in the original CBS television series – the typhoid epidemic that took the life of a popular character, Fairlight Spencer.

References

External links
 

Christy (novel)
Films shot in Vancouver
Films about Christianity
Christy: A Change of Seasons
Christy: A Change of Seasons
Films directed by George Kaczender
Films shot in North Carolina
2000s English-language films